HNLMS Tijgerhaai (S807) was a  of the Royal Netherlands Navy.

Ship history
The submarine was ordered 24 December 1965 and laid down on 14 July 1966 at the Rotterdamse Droogdok Mij shipyard in Rotterdam. She was launched on 25 May 1971. 20 October 1972 she was commissioned in the Dutch navy.

In November  1972 Tijgerhaai,  and air units of the Dutch navy took part in an exercise. In 1990 the boat made a visit to Scotland. The following year she made a visits to Norway and Scotland. The boat took part in an exercise called TFX in 1993. In 1993 the boat also made a trip to the United Kingdom and Ireland and a trip to the Mediterranean Sea.

In 1994 Tijgerhaai took part in the NATO exercise Isle d'or. Other exercises that year include an exercise called Jolly Roger, an exercise with German submarines and an exercise with English vessels.
The boat was decommissioned in 1995. Several countries expressed interest in buying the submarine but eventually no buyer was found and the boat is planned to be scrapped.

References

1971 ships
Ships built in Rotterdam
Zwaardvis-class submarines